Paul Evans Aidoo (born 4 August 1958) is a Ghanaian teacher and politician. He is the Member of Parliament for Sefwi-Wiawso and is the Minister for the Western Region of Ghana. Prior to heading the Western Region, he was the Brong-Ahafo Regional Minister. He has been condemned for "promoting hatred" by Ghana's Centre for Popular Education and Human Rights after the minister urged people to report suspected homosexuals. "All efforts are being made to get rid of these people in the society," he said.

Early life and education
Paul Aidoo was born on 4 August 1958 at Sefwi-Ewiase in the Sefwi-Wiawso District of the Western Region of Ghana. He studied privately for the General Certificate of Education Ordinary Level in 1980. He attended the Enchi Teacher Training College between 1977 and 1981, qualifying with Teachers’ Certificate’A’.

Career
Aidoo worked as a teacher between 1981 and 1985. He then worked with the National Mobilization Programme as a District Liaison Officer between 1985 and 1997. Between 1997 and 2001, he was a District Chief Executive with the Ministry of Local Government. From 2002 to 2004, he was a headmaster with the Ghana Education Service.

Politics
Aidoo is a member of the National Democratic Congress and won the Sefwi-Wiawso seat in the Ghanaian parliamentary election in 2004. He retained his seat in the 2008 election. In 2009, he was appointed Western Regional Minister by the President of Ghana, John Atta Mills and in March 2013, he was appointed Brong-Ahafo Regional Minister then re-appointed as Western Regional Minister in March 2014 by the President of Ghana, John Dramani Mahama. In July 2011, he called for Ghana's Bureau of National Investigations to arrest all homosexuals in the Western Region and asked landlords and tenants to report suspected homosexuals. He was reported as saying, "Once they have been arrested, they will be brought before the law". (A provision in the criminal code section of Ghana's 1992 constitution condemns "unnatural carnal knowledge". The constitution guarantees human rights "regardless of race, place of origin, political opinion, colour, religion, creed or gender", but not sexuality).

Personal life
Aidoo is married with eight children. He is a Catholic.

See also
List of Mills government ministers
National Democratic Congress (Ghana)
Sefwi-Wiawso

References

External links and sources
Profile on Parliament of Ghana website

Living people
1958 births
Government ministers of Ghana
Ghanaian MPs 2005–2009
Ghanaian MPs 2009–2013
Ghanaian MPs 2013–2017
Ghanaian educators
National Democratic Congress (Ghana) politicians
People from Western Region (Ghana)
Ghanaian Roman Catholics